Margaret Stafford (born 23 April 1931) is a British fencer. She competed in the women's individual foil event at the 1960 Summer Olympics.

References

1931 births
Living people
British female fencers
Olympic fencers of Great Britain
Fencers at the 1960 Summer Olympics
Sportspeople from London